Stenidea gomerae is a species of beetle in the family Cerambycidae. It was described by Sama in 1996, originally under the genus Deroplia. It is known from the Canary Islands.

References

gomerae
Beetles described in 1996